Next to Me is the sixth studio album by Dutch singer-songwriter Ilse DeLange.

Track listing
 "Next to Me"
 "Eyes Straight Ahead"
 "Almost"
 "Beautiful Distraction"
 "Carousel"
 "Untouchable"
 "Time Out"
 "Paper Plane"

Charts

Weekly charts

Year-end charts

References

External links
 Official website
 Official Myspace

2010 albums
Ilse DeLange albums